Dairy queen may refer to:
 Dairy Queen, an American fast food restaurant chain specializing in soft serve ice cream and ice cream cakes
 Dairy Queen (novel), a novel by Catherine Gilbert Murdock
 Dairy Queen (pageant), a title used by dairy industry pageants
 Dairy queen (slang), LGBT slang

See also
 
 
 
 Dairy (disambiguation)
 Queen (disambiguation)